Leopold Józef Rutowicz (born 18 October 1932 in Kraków)
is a Polish politician and
Member of the European Parliament (MEP)
for the MP & SW
with the Self-Defense,
and is therefore a Non-Inscrit in the European Parliament.

Rutowicz sits on its Committee on the Internal Market and Consumer Protection, and is
a substitute for the Committee on Employment and Social Affairs and a member of the
Delegation for relations with Australia and New Zealand.

Education
 1956: Master of Engineering, University of Mining and Metallurgy (AGH)
 1981: doctor of commodities science at the Academy of Economics in Kraków

Career
 1955-1968: Assistant and lecturer at AGH
 1957-1959: Senior technologist at the Fabryka Wyrobów Blaszanych (Tin Products Factory)
 1957-1963: chief mechanic at the Kraków Enterprise for General Construction
 1959-1990: Member of the Administration and Chairman of the Voivodeship Club for Technical Improvement and Innovation (Klub Racjonalizacji i Wynalazczości)
 1963-1967: head of the Ośrodek Prototypów Zakładu Badań i Doświadczeń Budownictwa (Prototype Centre of the Institute for Building Research and Testing)
 1967-1990: Deputy director and director of the Regional Office of Weights and Measures
 1967-1993: Member of the Administration and Chairman of the Association of Polish Engineers and Technicians, Kraków branch
 1990-1995: director of the Assay Office of Kraków

Decorations
 1977: Gold Cross of Merit
 1984: Knight's Cross - 'Polonia Restituta'

See also
 2004 European Parliament election in Poland

External links
 

1932 births
Living people
Self-Defence of the Republic of Poland MEPs
MEPs for Poland 2004–2009